Marley Station Mall is an enclosed shopping mall in Glen Burnie, Maryland. Opened in 1987, it was expanded in 1994 and 1996. The mall has 130 stores on 2 floors, a movie theater, and 5 anchor spaces. JCPenney, Macy's, and Golds Gym serve as the mall's current anchor tenants. The other two anchor spaces were occupied by Boscov's until 2008, and Sears until 2021.

History
Taubman Centers completed Marley Station in 1987. At the time, it included two anchor stores: Hecht's and Macy's. During construction in 1985 a body was discovered in a trash can on the site, which was not identified as Roger Kelso until 2019. Taubman expanded the mall in 1994 with a third anchor, JCPenney, which was the most-requested store among mall patrons at the time. Sears was added in 1996 as a fourth anchor. This store replaced an existing Sears in Glen Burnie which was built in the 1960s.

In 2006, Macy's relocated to the Hecht's building when Macy's parent company bought that of Hecht's and sold its original location to Boscov's. Boscov's operated out of the former Macy's for only two years, closing the store in 2008 as part of the chain's bankruptcy proceedings. It was reported in 2012 that a 300,000-square-foot data center would open in the former department store.

Taubman sold the mall to Mills Corporation, later part of Simon Property Group, in 2004. The Woodmont Company of Dallas/Fort Worth was appointed as the receiver to manage and lease Marley Station in March 2013 until Bank of America settles a loan dispute with Simon Property Group or forecloses.

In January 2012, AiNET purchased the largest single building at Marley Station mall, the former Boscov's space, to operate the CyberNAP data center. Unlike the rest of the mall (except Macy's), the AiNET space is three-stories. At capacity, AiNET expects $1 billion in economic activity and 2,500 jobs at CyberNAP.

In June 2013, AiNET (owner of CyberNAP) expressed an interest in buying all the properties to expand the data center throughout the mall. However, the mall's manager, The Woodmont Co., said there are no plans to sell or close down, but rather, "We are working to increase current occupancy by both retaining existing tenants as their leases renew and by leasing current vacancies."

At the start of 2012, Marley Station had a vacancy rate of 44%, up from 33% a year earlier.  In June 2013 a spokeswoman for Woodmont said the occupancy rate at the mall was close to 85%.

The mall was listed on a real estate web site as being up for auction on September 25, 2013.

An eight-screen movie theatre, originally operated by United Artists Theatres, opened on June 5, 1987, near the mall's food court. The Movies at Marley Station were later run by Regal Entertainment Group, which had acquired UA. On February 20, 2014, the theater closed its doors after nearly 27 years of service without notice. Two months later mall management announced that the theatres would be renovated and reopened in summer 2014. On June 20 Horizon Cinemas opened four theaters—with four more to follow later—featuring all new 3-D digital projectors, a new lobby with digital signage and upgraded concessions, updated bathrooms and roomier seating.

Moody's rates the mall's debt. As of the 2015 report, the mall had near term rollover risk and is advising investors to expect 70% losses on their investment. As of the 2016 report, the mall was 29% of the remaining fund and all classes of debt were rated as below investment grade or in default. The mall's occupancy was reported as under 75%.

During the same period, the mall was appraised for $39.8 million of the original $114.4M loan—in total there was a $88.7M difference between the appraisal and the total amount due on the loan.

Aeropostale as part of its bankruptcy announced it would close its store at Marley Station Mall in 2016.

In a February 2016 appraisal, the mall's appraised value dropped to $31.5M (-22.4%).

In September 2016, Marley Station was listed for auction on the Ten-X website with a starting price of $5,000,000. The mall ownership rebuffed an earlier $10,000,000 offer by AiNET's Deepak Jain.

In an auction ended on October 19, 2016, Marley Station was sold by LNR Properties LLC to G.L. Harris for a price revealed after closing on December 20, 2016, to be $22.7 million. LNR Properties bought the property from TKL East in 2014. TKL East obtained it through foreclosure from original owner Simon Property Group. The mall's vacancy rate was reported in January 2017 to be just over 2%.

Marley Station Mall went back to auction on September 14, 2020. The sale price was $1.65M plus at least $15M existing debt. The sale was halted in November 2020 by the Texas Bankruptcy Court.

On November 6, 2020, it was announced that Sears would be closing  as part of a plan to close 7 stores nationwide which left JCPenney and Macy's as the only traditional anchors left. The store closed on January 24, 2021.

On June 14, 2022, news broke that the mall has been sold to a New York-based partnership consisting of Mason Asset Management and Namdar Realty Group. Their plans involve an "aggressive leasing strategy" to improve current vacancy rates in the mall.

Current anchors
JCPenney (since 1994)
Macy's (Second Building, 2006–present)
Gold's Gym
Horizon Cinemas (since 2014)

Former anchors
Hecht's (1987-2006)
Macy's (First Building, 1987–2006), Boscov's (2006–2008)
Sears (1996-2021)
United Artists Theatres (1987–2014)

References

External links
Dead Mall Series 
Marley Station Mall web site
Property Detail Information at The Woodmont Company web site

Shopping malls established in 1987
Shopping malls in Maryland
Buildings and structures in Anne Arundel County, Maryland
Glen Burnie, Maryland
1987 establishments in Maryland